Ashwin or Asveen is an Indian given name. It is related to the name of the Ashvins, the divine twins of Vedic mythology, as well as to the name of the Hindu lunar month Ashvin.

People with the name 

Ravichandran Ashwin, Indian cricketer
Ashwin Sanghi, Indian writer
Ashwin Mushran, Actor
Nag Ashwin
Ashwin Kakumanu
Ashwin Dani
Sumanth Ashwin
Ashwin Sood
Ashwin Shekhar
Ashwin Kumar
Ashwin Sanghi
Murugan Ashwin
Ashwin Adhin
Ashwin Ram
Ashwin Choksi
Ashwin Srivastava
Ashwin Batish
Ashwin Sundar
Ashwin Chitale
Ashwin Mahesh
Ashwin Navin
Ashwin Hebbar
Ashwin Balrak
Ashwin Gumaste
Chris Ashwin
Ashwin Joshi
Herbert Ashwin Budd
Ashwin Willemse
Ashwin Balachand Mehta
Ashwin Das
Ashwin Yadav
Ashwin Scott

See also

Indian masculine given names